Pinch Creek is a stream in the U.S. state of West Virginia. It is a tributary of the Elk River.

The creek, originally called Pinch Gut Creek, was so named on account of there being little food available to pioneers.

See also
List of rivers of West Virginia

References

Rivers of Kanawha County, West Virginia
Rivers of West Virginia